Ann Dowd (born January 30, 1956) is an American actress. She has played supporting roles in numerous films, including Green Card (1990), Lorenzo's Oil (1992), Philadelphia (1993), Garden State (2004), The Manchurian Candidate (2004), Marley & Me (2008), Side Effects (2013), St. Vincent (2014), Captain Fantastic (2016), and Hereditary (2018). Dowd appeared as Sandra in the thriller film Compliance (2012), for which she received the National Board of Review Award for Best Supporting Actress.

Dowd was a series regular on the HBO series The Leftovers (2014–2017), for which she received a Primetime Emmy Award nomination for Outstanding Guest Actress in a Drama Series. In 2017, she began playing Aunt Lydia Clements on the Hulu series The Handmaid's Tale, for which she won the Primetime Emmy Award for Outstanding Supporting Actress in a Drama Series.

In 2021, Dowd starred in the ensemble drama film Mass, for which she has received critical recognition and awards, including nominations from the Critics' Choice Awards, and the BAFTA.

Early life
Ann Dowd was born on January 30, 1956, in Holyoke, Massachusetts, the daughter of John and Dolores (born Clark) Dowd. She is one of seven children, who were raised by their mother after her father died when Ann was a senior in high school. Her mother later married Philip Dean, a doctor. Her sister Kathleen (Kate) Dowd is a casting director based in London; brother John Dowd Jr. is president of The Dowd Agencies, an insurance company started by their great-grandfather; sister Elizabeth Dowd is a developmental therapist and parenting coach; sister Clare Dowd is executive director of the Creative Action Institute; sister Deborah Dowd is a psychotherapist, and former president of the Massachusetts Institute for Psychoanalysis; and brother Gregory Dowd is a doctor of veterinary medicine. Her paternal grandfather was James "Kip" Dowd, a former Major League baseball player for the Pittsburgh Pirates.

Dowd's family is Irish Catholic. She attended the Williston Northampton School, where she performed in school plays. Dowd became interested in acting at a young age but was dissuaded by her family at first because they did not approve of her pursuing an acting career. She graduated in 1978 from College of the Holy Cross in Worcester, Massachusetts where much of Dowd's family also attended and she was a premed student and took acting classes. Dowd credits her instructors and roommate at that time for persuading her to forgo medical school and follow her passion for acting. She traveled to New York City to audition for the Goodman School of Drama at DePaul University in Chicago, where she received an MFA in Acting. While at DePaul, Dowd received a prestigious scholarship from the Sarah Siddons Society, an award that had also gone to Carrie Snodgress. Dowd was classmates with Elizabeth Perkins and also worked as a waitress during this time.

Dowd spent several years performing in regional theatre in the Chicago area, performing often at the Court Theatre, later deciding in 1988 to move to New York City to pursue a bigger stage. She pounded the pavement and her first acting gig there was with the Hartford Stage Company.

Career

Film
Dowd starred in Shiloh (1997) and its sequels, Shiloh 2: Shiloh Season (1999) and Saving Shiloh (2006) as Louise Preston. She appears in the 1997 cult film All Over Me and in the 1998 film Apt Pupil, in which she played the mother of Brad Renfro's character. Dowd has acted in two films directed by Jonathan Demme, as Jill Beckett, sister of Tom Hanks's character, Andrew Beckett, in Philadelphia (1993), and in The Manchurian Candidate (2004), starring Meryl Streep. Also in 2004, Dowd played the mother of Natalie Portman's character in Garden State and appeared in The Forgotten starring Julianne Moore. In 2005, she starred opposite Gretchen Mol in The Notorious Bettie Page, portraying Edna Page, Bettie Page's mother. She also played the role of Mrs. Strank in the 2006 Clint Eastwood film Flags of Our Fathers.

In 2008, Dowd appeared in Marley & Me starring Jennifer Aniston. She received rave reviews for her work in the 2012 movie Compliance, which premiered at the Sundance Film Festival. In the film, Dowd plays Sandra, a fast food restaurant manager caught in a mysterious ethical nightmare. For this role, Dowd was nominated for an Independent Spirit Award for Best Supporting Actress and received the National Board of Review award. She has played supporting roles in two Steven Soderbergh films, The Informant! in 2009, and Side Effects in 2013, in which she played the mother of Channing Tatum's character. She played the supporting role of Joan in the 2018 horror film Hereditary.

Television
Dowd's first appearance was in the 1985 television movie First Steps with fellow Chicago actor Megan Mullally. She has appeared in many popular television shows including House and Louie, on both of which she played a nun. Other shows include Chicago Hope, The X-Files, Third Watch, NYPD Blue, Judging Amy and Freaks and Geeks, in which she played the mother of Busy Philipps. Dowd has also appeared in many episodes of the Law & Order franchise. In 1995 she portrayed Rose Long, Louisiana's first female senator, in the television movie Kingfish, opposite John Goodman. In 2008 she appeared in the television movie Taking Chance starring Kevin Bacon. Dowd was a series regular on Nothing Sacred, which was filmed in Los Angeles and aired for one season (97/98), in which she played a nun. For this role she was nominated for a VQT award for Best Supporting Actress. Dowd also co-starred on The Leftovers as Patti Levin, leader of the group The Guilty Remnant. In 2017, Dowd began starring as Aunt Lydia Clements on the Hulu series The Handmaid's Tale, for which she won a Primetime Emmy Award.

In 2021, she was cast as Edna Garrett for the third installment of Live in Front of a Studio Audience on ABC, featuring both Diff'rent Strokes and the spin-off The Facts of Life.

Theatre
Dowd has appeared on Broadway three times. In 1993 she received the Clarence Derwent Award for her Broadway debut performance in the play Candida starring Mary Steenburgen. She next appeared in Taking Sides (1996) with Elizabeth Marvel, and Vera Farmiga, who was Dowd's understudy. In 2008 she appeared in The Seagull starring Carey Mulligan and Kristin Scott Thomas. Dowd has also won three Jeff Awards for her work in Chicago theatre, including a 1987 Best Supporting Actress award for her role as Emma Brookner in The Normal Heart. In 2007, Dowd played the role of Sister Aloysius in Doubt at the George Street Playhouse. The New York Times described her performance as "chilling" and said she was "masterful in this role." In 2011, Dowd performed Off-Broadway in Blood from a Stone, playing the mother of Ethan Hawke. In 2015, Dowd starred in Naomi Wallace's play, Night is a Room at Signature Theater.

Personal life
Dowd and her husband, Lawrence "Larry" Arancio, both coach acting and are frequent collaborators. Arancio, who is from New York City, is a writer and acting chair for the CAP21 program who has also taught at the HB Studio and Columbia College Chicago. He has worked with Lady Gaga as her acting coach. Dowd and Arancio met while students in Chicago. They have three children, Liam, Emily, and Trust, and reside in New York City. Dowd is a foster care advocate. Her alma mater College of the Holy Cross conferred an honorary Doctor of Fine Arts degree on her on May 27, 2016.

Filmography

Film

Television

Theater

Awards and nominations

References

External links

1956 births
Living people
American film actresses
American television actresses
20th-century American actresses
21st-century American actresses
Outstanding Performance by a Supporting Actress in a Drama Series Primetime Emmy Award winners
College of the Holy Cross alumni
DePaul University alumni
People from Holyoke, Massachusetts
Actresses from Massachusetts